Race of Champions is an international motorsport event.

Race of Champions may also refer to:

Race of Champions (Brands Hatch), Formula One race
Race of Champions (modified racing), modified version of the race
Race of Champions (Irish greyhounds), a major Irish greyhound competition

Video games
F1 ROC: Race of Champions, a 1992 video game
F1 ROC II: Race of Champions, a 1993 video game
Michelin Rally Masters: Race of Champions, a 2000 video game
Rally Fusion: Race of Champions, a 2002 video game

See also
International Race of Champions, North American auto racing competition